Francesco Tabai (22 February 1908 – 3 September 1984) was an Italian male long, triple jumper and decathlete who competed at the 1932 Summer Olympics.

National titles
He won five national championships at individual senior level.

Italian Athletics Championships
Long jump: 1933, 1934
triple jump: 1936, 1937
Decathlon: 1931

References

External links
 

1908 births
1984 deaths
Athletes (track and field) at the 1932 Summer Olympics
Italian male long jumpers
Italian male triple jumpers
Italian decathletes
Olympic athletes of Italy